JN Data is a Danish IT company focused on the delivery of  IT-operations and infrastructure to the financial sector. The Company is owned by Jyske Bank A/S, Nykredit Realkredit A/S, BEC, Bankdata and SDC and has around 670 employees. In Denmark JN Data has locations in Silkeborg and Roskilde, and besides that the company have around 180 IT consultants in Poland.

History 
In 2002, Jyske Bank A/S og Nykredit Realkredit A/S merged the internal IT services and production departments and created a new company called JN Data. For the first eight years the company serviced its owners, and since then BEC, Bankdata, SDC and EG Silkeborg Data have also become customers of JN Data. In 2018, the circle of owners was expanded with BEC, Bankdata and SDC.

Management

Management 

 Søren Lindgaard, CEO
 Jacob Moesgaard, CFO

Board of Directors
 David Hellerman, Nykredit, Chairman
 Peter Schleidt, Jyske Bank, Vice Chairman
 Esben Kolind Laustrup, Bankdata
 Jesper Nielsen, BEC
Jesper Scharff, SDC
 Annette Juul, employee representative
 Henrik Holm, employee representative
Christoffer Lykbak, employee representative

References

JN Data´s annual report 2021

JN Data´s annual report 2020

JN Data´s annual report 2019

JN Data´s annual report 2018

External links
 Official website

2002 establishments in Denmark
Companies established in 2002
Companies based in Silkeborg Municipality
Silkeborg
Software companies of Denmark